Sharma is a Brahmin Hindu surname in India and Nepal.  The Sanskrit stem  (nom. ) can mean 'joyfulness', 'comfort', 'happiness'. Sarma is an alternative English spelling of the name. Some Assamese Brahmins use Sarmah.

According to the Bhavishya Purana, Sensharma or Sharma is the first Brahmin surname. Parashurama, sixth avatar of Vishnu, is said to have given this title to King Jaisen.

People
Notable people with the surname Sharma, Sarma or Sarmah include:

A
Abhishek Sharma (disambiguation), several people
Adah Sharma, Indian actress
Aditi Sharma (actress, born 1983), Indian film and TV actress
Aditi Sharma (actress, born 1996), Indian TV actress
Aditi Sharma (cricketer), Indian cricketer
Agni Sharma (Valmiki), Indian author
Aham Sharma, Indian film and TV actor
Ajay Sharma (1988–1993), Indian cricketer
Akash Sharma, Indian cricketer
Akki Sharma, Nepalese visual effect artist
Alok Sharma, British politician with the Conservative Party in the United Kingdom
Alok Sharma (cricketer), Indian cricketer
Amit Prakash Sharma, Indian parasitologist
Amit Sharma (cricketer), Indian cricketer
Anand Sharma, Indian politician
Anant Sharma (1919–1988), Indian railway union leader, also Minister of State for Industry, and Union Minister
Anil Sharma, several people
Anjali Sharma (climate activist), Australian environmentalist
Anjani Kumar Sharma, Nepalese surgeon
Ankit Sharma (athlete), Indian athlete
Ankit Sharma (cricketer), Indian cricketer
Ankit Sharma (footballer), Indian footballer
Ankitta Sharma, Indian TV actress
Anna Sharma, (born 1995) Nepalese actress
Anthony Francis Sharma, Nepalese Jesuit
Anup Raj Sharma, was Chief Justice of Nepal
Anu Sharma, American audiologist and academic
Anuj Sharma, Indian singer
Anushka Sharma (born 1988), Indian film actress and producer
Archana Sharma (botanist) (1932–2008), Indian cytogeneticist and cytotoxicologist
Aribam Syam Sharma, Indian film director and composer
Arun Kumar Sarmah, Indian politician
Arun Kumar Sharma, Indian biologist
Ashish Sharma, Indian film and television actor
Astra Sharma, Australian tennis player
Avinash Sharma (born 1981), New Zealand and Oxford University cricketer

B
B. D. Sharma (1918–1993), Chief Minister of Haryana, Governor of Odisha and Madhya Pradesh (India)
B. N. Sarma (1867–1932), Indian lawyer, politician and freedom fighter
Babita Sharma, British television newsreader on BBC News (TV channel) and BBC World News
Basanti Sarma, Indian politician
Benudhar Sharma, Indian historian
Bhagwatikumar Sharma (1934–2018), Indian Gujarati language author and journalist
Bhakti Sharma, Indian open water swimmer
Brajanath Sarma, Assamese playwright and actor
Bipul Sharma, Indian cricket player

C
Charu Sharma, Indian cricket commentator
 Charu Sharma (athlete) (born 1992), Indian athlete and performer
Chetan Sharma, Indian cricketer, politician (nephew of Yashpal Sharma another cricketer)
Chris Sharma, American rock climber
Cindy Devika Sharma, Trinidad and Tobago politician

D
Deepak Sarma, American professor of Hinduism and Indian philosophy
Deepak Sharma (disambiguation), several people
Deepti Sharma (born 1997), Indian cricketer
Deen Bandhu Sharma, Indian writer from Jammu and Kashmir
Dheeraj Sharma (filmmaker), Indian film director and social workerBherumal Meharchand Advani
Dheeraj Sharma (professor), Indian professor of management
Dina Nath Sharma, Nepalese politician
Dinesh Sharma (actor), Nepalese actor
Dinesh Sharma (politician), Indian politician, mayor of Lucknow
Dinesh Sharma (academic), Indian social scientist, psychologist, academic and author
Dineshwar Sharma (1954–2020), Indian police officer
Dipannita Sharma (born 1979), Indian model and actress
Divyendu Sharma (born 1983), known as Divyenndu, Indian film actor
Dwijen Sharma, Bangladeshi naturalist and science writer

E
Evelyn Sharma (born 1986), German actress (of Indian origin)

G
Geetanjali Sharma (born 1984), Indian classical dancer 
Gaurav Sharma (author) (born 1992), Indo-Canadian author
Gaurav Sharma (engineer), American engineer 
Gaurav Sharma (politician), (born 1987), New Zealand doctor and politician
Girish Sharma, Indian comedian
G. R. Sharma (1919–1986), Indian historian
Gokul Sharma (born 1985), Indian cricketer playing for Assam
Gopal Sharma (1985–1990), Indian cricketer (spin-bowler)
Gyanesh Sharma (born 1963), Indian politician

H
Hariharan Raja Sharma, Indian politician, usually known as H. Raja
Himanshu Sharma, Indian screenwriter
Himanta Biswa Sarma, Current Chief Minister Of Assam

I
Ishant Sharma (born 1988), Indian cricketer playing for Team India
Ishani Sharma, Indian TV actress

J
Janamanchi Seshadri Sarma, Telugu poet
Jagdish Sharma, Indian politician
Janardhan Sharma, Nepalese politician
Jaswant Rai Sharma, better known by his pen name Naqsh Lyallpuri, Indian lyricist
Jaya Sharma, Indian cricketer who has played one women's test match
Jhabarmal Sharma, Indian journalist and historian of Rajasthan
Jitesh Sharma (born 1993), Indian cricketer playing for Vidarbha
Joginder Sharma, Indian cricketer player
Jyotirmaya Sharma, Indian political scientist

K
K. V. Sarma, Indian science historian
Kamalesh Sharma, Indian diplomat and 5th Secretary-General of the Commonwealth
Kapil Sharma (comedian) (born 1981), Indian stand-up comedian, actor, TV host and producer
Karan Sharma (disambiguation), several people
Karanvir Sharma, Hindi film and television actor
Karn Sharma, Indian cricketer
Karthik Sarma (born 1974/1975), Indian-American billionaire hedge fund manager
Kavana Sarma, Indian engineer
Khadga Prasad Sharma Oli, present Prime Minister of Nepal
Kidar Sharma (1910–1999), Indian film director, producer, screenwriter, and lyricist
Konkona Sen Sharma (born 1979), Indian actress
Kriti Sharma, Indian artificial intelligence technologist 
Kuldeep Sharma, MLA for Ganaur in Haryana
Kum Uma Sharma (born 1942), Indian kathak dancer, choreographer, and teacher

L
Lalit Mohan Sharma (1928–2008), 24th Chief Justice of India
Laxmi Sharma, Nepali entrepreneur

M
Mahesh Sharma (born 1959), Indian politician (Bharatiya Janata Party)
Mahika Sharma (born 1994), Indian actress and model
Mamta Sharma, Indian singer (Dabangg fam)
Manish Sharma (disambiguation), several people
Manju Sharma (biologist) (born 1940), Indian biologist from Gandhinagar
Manu Sharma (born 1977), Indian, also known as Siddharth Vashisht, convicted for the 1999 murder of Jessica Lal
Mithila Sharma, Nepalese actress
Mukesh Sharma, Public Auditor, Government of India
Murari Raj Sharma, Nepalese diplomat
Murli Sharma, Indian actor

N
Neha Sharma (born 1987), Indian film actress and model
Nia Sharma (born 1990), Indian television actress
Nikita Sharma, Indian TV actress
Nilamber Dev Sharma, Indian scholar and writer of Dogri and English literature
Nupur Sharma, Indian politician

P
Pankaj Sharma, British neurologist at Royal Holloway College, London
Paras Sharma, Indian cricketer who plays for Jammu and Kashmir
Paridhi Sharma, Indian television actress
Parvez Sharma, Indian writer and filmmaker
Phaldut Sharma, British actor and dancer
Phani Sarma, Assamese playwright and actor
Pooja Sharma (disambiguation)

R
R. S. Sharma (disambiguation), multiple people
Rabindra Nath Sharma, Nepalese politician
Rahul Sharma (disambiguation), several people
Rajan Sarma, Tamil-language actor
Rajat Sharma (born 1957), Indian Hindi TV news channel editor
Rajendra Prasad Sharma (born 1960), IPS, DGP officer, Orissa Police
Rajesh Kumar Sharma (born 1978), Bihar Politician, Health Minister
Rajesh Sharma (disambiguation), several people
Rajiv Sharma, New Zealand cricketer
Rakesh Sharma (born 1949), Indian Air Force pilot who flew aboard Soyuz T-11
Ram Avatar Sharma, Indian Sanskrit scholar
Ram Karan Sharma, Indian Sanskrit poet
Ram Sharan Sharma, Indian historian
Ram Vilas Sharma (1912–2000), Indian literary critic, linguist, and poet
Reecha Sharma, Nepalese actress
Rhea Sharma, Indian Television actress
Richa Sharma (disambiguation), several people
Riniki Bhuyan Sarma, Indian lawyer, entrepreneur and social activist.
Robin Sharma (born 1965), Canadian writer, leadership speaker
Rohit Sharma (born 1987), Indian cricketer

S
S. Sharma, communist leader
Sagar Sharma, Indian cricketer
Sameer Sharma, Indian television actor
Sankar Das Sarma, American scientist
Sandeep Sharma (born 1993), Indian cricketer, playing domestic cricket for Punjab
Sanjay Sarma, Indian professor of mechanical engineering and the Vice President for Open Learning at MIT
Sanjeev Sharma (1988–1990), Indian cricketer
Sanu Sharma, Australian writer of Nepalese nationality
Satish Kumar Sharma, Indian National Congress party politician, MP representing Madhya Pradesh in the Rajya Sabha
Satish Sharma (1947–2021), Indian National Congress party politician, and member of the Union Cabinet
Satnarine Sharma, former Chief Justice of Trinidad and Tobago
Shankar Dayal Sharma (1918–1999), ninth President of India
Shankar Prasad Sharma, Nepalese diplomat 
Shefali Sharma, Indian TV actress
Shivkumar Sharma (born 1939), Indian Santoor player
Shreya Sharma, Indian child film actress
Shrikant Sharma, politician from Mathura
Sree Harilal Sarma, Indian Navy Admiral
Shubhlakshmi Sharma, Indian cricketer
Shyam Sunder Sharma, 7-times MLA from Mant
Subbaraya Sharma, Indian Telugu theatre, television and movie artist
Sudheer Sharma, Nepalese journalist
Sunil Kumar Sharma (disambiguation), multiple people
Suresh Raj Sharma, Nepalese academician
Surendra Nath Sharma (1910–1987), known as Surendra, Indian singer-actor of Hindi films

T
Tara Sharma, Hindi-language film actress
Tara Nath Sharma, Nepalese writer
Tarali Sarma, Indian singer
Tanya Sharma, Indian TV actress
Tilak Ram Sharma (born 1968), Nepali politician
Tunisha Sharma, Indian TV actress

U
Umang Sharma (born 1989), Indian cricketer playing for Uttar Pradesh
Umesh Sharma, Indian politician and member of the Bharatiya Janata Party
Urvashi Sharma, Indian actress
Upendranath Sharma (1910–1996), pen name Upendranath Ashk, Indian poet
Utkarsh Sharma, Indian actor

V
Venod Sharma (born 1948), Indian politician, founder of the Haryana Jan Chetna Party (V)
Vinod Prakash Sharma (1938–2015), Indian malariologist
Vineet Kumar Sharma, Indian field hockey player
Virendra Sharma, British Politician
Vishal Sharma (disambiguation), several people
Vishnu Sharma, author of Panchtantra
Vishwa Nath Sharma (born 1930), Indian Chief of the Army Staff
Vivek Sharma, born 1969, Indian filmmaker
Vivekanand Sharma (1938–2006), Fiji Indian politician and religious worker

Y
Yashpal Sharma (actor) (born 1967), Indian actor
Yashpal Sharma (cricketer) (1954–2021), Indian cricketer
Yuyutsu Sharma, Nepalese writer

References

Further reading 

Indian surnames
Brahmin communities
Hindu surnames
Assamese-language surnames
Bihari-language surnames
Gujarati-language surnames
Punjabi-language surnames